Fusarium oxysporum f.sp. batatas is a fungal plant pathogen infecting sweet potatoes.

References

External links
 USDA ARS Fungal Database

oxysporum f.sp. batatas
Fungal plant pathogens and diseases
Root vegetable diseases
Fungi described in 1940
Forma specialis taxa